Burhan Tia (born 1965) is a Sudanese football manager who is currently coaching the Sudan national team.

Managerial career
In 1995, Tia entered management, taking charge of Al-Mourada, guiding the team to continental qualification. Tia later managed Khartoum-based club Al Ahli, Al-Merreikh Al-Thagher, Hay Al-Arab, Alamal Atbara, Kadougli-based club Al-Hilal, Al-Merreikh Al-Fasher, Al-Hilal Al-Fasher, Al Neel, Al-Merrikh and Al-Tuti.

In December 2021, Tia was appointed as the Sudan national football team's manager for the 2021 Africa Cup of Nations, replacing Hubert Velud.

References

Date of birth missing (living people)
1965 births
Living people
Sudanese football managers
Al-Merrikh SC managers
Sudan national football team managers